is the sixth Japanese single by South Korean girl group Kara. It was released on March 21, 2012, and was the group's first double A-side single.

Background 
Information about the single first emerged after someone on Twitter tweeted a picture of what appears to be of member JiYoung on the set of a music video. The picture was a screen capture from an iMac computer and showed "kara speed up" on top of the title bar. Details about a double A-side single titled "Speed Up / Girl's Power" being released on March 21 then began spreading around the internet.

Universal Music Japan eventually confirmed the single's release on February 27, 2012. On the same day Japanese program "ZIP!" aired a preview for both the song's music videos.

Composition 
The single contains two tracks of completely different sounds. The concept of the single was to show the members’ various personalities and the different sides of the group.

"Speed Up" is an electro and dance-pop song with an uptempo beat that uses light vocal enchantments. The song shows the group's mature side. It was produced by Congolese R&B singer-songwriter Mohombi who had previously worked with South Korean group BIG BANG on a number of their Japanese songs.

"Girl's Power" is mid-tempo song with a softer tone. It was produced by Han-San Wong who previously worked with the group for the single, "Go Go Summer!". It shows a more feminine and softer side to the group. The song is also being used for the new commercial of DARIYA's hair dye product line "Palty" which the group had previously endorsed in 2011.

Music video 
During the February 27 episode of the Japanese program ZIP!, a preview for the music videos of both single's was shown. They also showed a brief behind-the-scenes footage of the girls while recording the videos for both the singles as well as the group celebrating member Goo Hara's 21st birthday while sharing a cake with the staff and crew at the studio. On February 28, 2012, the teasers for both music videos was uploaded on the Universal Music Japan and the group's YouTube channels.

The music video for both songs premiered on Japan's Mezamashi TV on separate days with "Speed Up" first airing on March 1 followed by 
"Girl's Power" on March 2.

Live performances 
The group made the first performance of the song "Speed Up" on TBS's show Coming Soon!! on March 19 and another performances of the song on TBS's Count Down TV on March 24, on NHK's Music Japan on March 25, on TV Asahi's Music Station on April 6 during its 3-hour special and on Fuji TV's Hey! Hey! Hey! Music Champ on April 9.

The group also performed the songs during their Karasia tour in Japan.

Track listing

Chart performance 
On its first day of its physical release, the single sold 21,352 copies and quickly rose to No. 2 on the Oricon Daily chart. It sold 22,063 copies on the following day and placed 3rd.

Oricon chart

Other charts

Speed Up / Girl's Power

Speed Up

Girl's Power

Step (Japanese version)

Sales and certifications

Release history

References

2012 singles
Dance-pop songs
Japanese-language songs
Kara (South Korean group) songs
2012 songs
Songs written by Mohombi